Imre Szöllősi (19 February 1941 – 27 December 2022) was a Hungarian sprint canoeist who competed in the 1960, 1964, and 1968 Olympics. He won two silver medals in 1960: in the individual 1000 m and 4×500 m relay events, and a bronze in 1968 in the fours. In 1964 he placed fourth-fifth in the doubles and fours.

Szöllősi also won three medals at the ICF Canoe Sprint World Championships, with a gold in K-2 10,000 m in 1966 and two silvers: in K-2 10,000 m in 1970 and in K-4 10,000 m in 1966.

Szöllősi died on 27 December 2022, at the age of 81.

References

External links 
 
 
 

1941 births
2022 deaths
Hungarian male canoeists
Olympic canoeists of Hungary
Olympic silver medalists for Hungary
Olympic bronze medalists for Hungary
Olympic medalists in canoeing
Canoeists at the 1960 Summer Olympics
Canoeists at the 1964 Summer Olympics
Canoeists at the 1968 Summer Olympics
Medalists at the 1960 Summer Olympics
Medalists at the 1968 Summer Olympics
ICF Canoe Sprint World Championships medalists in kayak
Canoeists from Budapest
20th-century Hungarian people